Anke Van Gestel (born 19 August 1993) is a Belgian kickboxer, who has been professionally competing since 2010. She is the current ISKA World Super Lightweight K1 and Light Welterweight Oriental Rules champion, and the former Enfusion 61 and 64 kg Champion.

In June 2020, Combat Press ranked her as #8 female fighter in the world.

Martial arts career
Anke Van Gestel had her first kickboxing bout against Griet Eeckhout in November of 2010. She won the fight by unanimous decision to become the Belgian kickboxing champion.

In the following two years Van Gestel amassed an 8-1-2 record, with a notable win over Hatice Ozyurt. She then entered the Amazon of K-1 Grand Prix, but lost to Martina Jindrová in the first round.

After a win over Eva Berben, Van Gestel faced Ilona Wijmans for the inaugural Enfusion 61 kg title. She won the fight and title by unanimous decision.

Following her Enfusion title win, she fought Angélique Pitiot for the ISKA Super Lightweight World Championship. Pitiot would win a unanimous decision.

Van Gestel then challenged Sarah Debaieb and won the WFCS 61 kg title.

In 2014, a year after winning the Enfusion 61 kg title, she defended it with a unanimous decision win over Lindsay Haycraft.

This title defense was followed by a three fight losing streak, culminating with a failed bid to capture the WKU Lightweight title.

In 2015, Van Gestel once again defended her title with a unanimous decision win over Aleide Lawant. Her third and last title defense came against Niamh Kinehan during Enfusion 48.

In November of 2017 Van Gestel challenged Deniz Batlini for the ISKA Super Lightweight title, and captured it with a unanimous decision win.

The following year she challenged Cindy Perros for the light welterweight ISKA World title, but lost a decision. In her following fight she once against faced Cindy Perros, but this time Van Gestel was defending her super lightweight title. She managed to win by a unanimous decision.

Championships and accomplishments

Kickboxing Titles
Enfusion
Enfusion 61 kg Championship
Two successful title defenses
Enfusion 64 kg Championship
One successful title defense
First Enfusion two weight champion
One of only four Enfusion two weight champions
International Sport Karate Association
ISKA Super Lightweight K1 World Championship
One successful title defense
ISKA Light Welterweight Oriental Rules World Championship

Muay Thai Titles
WCFS
WCFS 61 kg World Championship

Kickboxing record

|-  bgcolor=
|-  bgcolor="#CCFFCC"
| 30 Nov 2019|| Win||align=left| Denise Cedola || Prime Time || Merchtem, Belgium || Decision (Unanimous) || 3 || 3:00 || 28–13–2
|-  bgcolor="#CCFFCC"
| 23 Feb 2019|| Win||align=left| Sarel de Jong || Enfusion 78 || Eindhoven, Netherlands || Decision (Unanimous) || 3 || 3:00 || 27–13–2
|-  bgcolor="#CCFFCC"
| 9 Jun 2018|| Win||align=left| Cindy Perros || Prime Time 9 || Merchtem, France || Decision (Unanimous) || 5 || 3:00 || 26–13–2
|-
! style=background:white colspan=9 |
|-
|-  bgcolor="#FFBBBB"
| 9 Jun 2018|| Loss||align=left| Cindy Perros || Gal Kickboxing || Quimperlé, France || Decision (Unanimous) || 5 || 3:00 || 25–13–2
|-
! style=background:white colspan=9 |
|-
|-  bgcolor="#FFBBBB"
| 6 May 2018|| Loss||align=left| Anissa Haddaoui || Kunlun Fight 73 || Sanya, China || Decision (Unanimous) || 3 || 3:00 || 25–12–2
|-  bgcolor="#CCFFCC"
| 25 Nov 2017|| Win||align=left| Deniz Batlini || Prime Time 8 || Merchtem, Belgium || Decision (Unanimous) || 3 || 3:00 || 25–11–2
|-
! style=background:white colspan=9 |
|-
|-  bgcolor="#FFBBBB"
| 23 Sep 2017|| Loss||align=left| Jorina Baars || Bellator Kickboxing 7 || San Jose, California, United States || Decision (Unanimous) || 5 || 3:00 || 24–11–2
|-  bgcolor="#CCFFCC"
| 20 May 2017|| Win||align=left| Orinta van der Zee || Battle Royal || Mariakerke, Belgium || Decision (Unanimous) || 3 || 3:00 || 24–10–2
|-  bgcolor="#FFBBBB"
| 23 Sep 2017|| Loss||align=left| Wang Kehan || Kunlun Fight 61 || Sanya, China || Decision (Unanimous) || 3 || 3:00 || 23–10–2
|-  bgcolor="#CCFFCC"
| 24 Mar 2017|| Win||align=left| Niamh Kinehan || Enfusion 48 || Abu Dhabi, United Arab Emirates || Decision (Unanimous) || 5 || 3:00 || 23–9–2
|-
! style=background:white colspan=9 |
|-
|-  bgcolor="#CCFFCC"
| 26 Nov 2016|| Win||align=left| Niamh Kinehan || Prime Time 7 || Merchtem, Belgium || Decision (Unanimous) || 5 || 3:00 || 22–9–2
|-  bgcolor="#CCFFCC"
| 5 Jun 2016|| Win||align=left| Paola Cappucci || ACB KB 6: Battle in Brussels || Brussels, Belgium || TKO || 1 || 2:45 || 21–9–2
|-  bgcolor="#CCFFCC"
| 7 May 2016|| Win||align=left| Anissa Haddaoui || King Of The Ring IX || Hamme, Belgium || Decision (Unanimous) || 3 || 3:00 || 20–9–2
|-  bgcolor="#CCFFCC"
| 19 Dec 2015|| Win||align=left| Rachida Bouhout || Enfusion 35 || Antwerp, Belgium || Decision (Unanimous) || 3 || 3:00 || 19–9–2
|-
! style=background:white colspan=9 |
|-
|-  bgcolor="#CCFFCC"
| 28 Nov 2015|| Win||align=left| Irene Martens ||  Prime Time 6 || Merchtem, Belgium || Decision (Unanimous) || 3 || 3:00 || 18–9–2
|-  bgcolor="#CCFFCC"
| 10 Oct 2015|| Win||align=left| Aleide Lawant || Enfusion 32 || Ghent, Belgium || Decision (Unanimous) || 5 || 3:00 || 17–9–2
|-
! style=background:white colspan=9 |
|-
|-  bgcolor="#FFBBBB"
| 24 Jul 2015|| Loss||align=left| Valentina Shevchenko || Legacy Kickboxing 3 || Houston, Texas, United States || Decision (Unanimous) || 3 || 3:00 || 16–9–2
|-  bgcolor="#CCFFCC"
| 6 Jun 2015|| Win||align=left| Sandra Sevilla || 10eme Anniversaire de l’USAO Muaythai || Arras, France || Decision (Unanimous) || 3 || 3:00 || 16–8–2
|-  bgcolor="#CCFFCC"
| 9 May 2015|| Win||align=left| Eva Berben || The Night of no Return || Koersel, Belgium || KO || 2 ||  || 15–8–2
|-  bgcolor="#FFBBBB"
| 11 Dec 2014|| Loss||align=left| Julia Irmen || WKU World Title || Munich, Germany || Decision (Unanimous) || 5 || 3:00 || 14–8–2
|-
! style=background:white colspan=9 |
|-
|-  bgcolor="#FFBBBB"
| 29 Nov 2014|| Loss||align=left| Rachida Bouhout || Prime Time 5 || Merchtem, Belgium || Decision (Unanimous) || 3 || 3:00 || 14–7–2
|-  bgcolor="#FFBBBB"
| 15 Nov 2014|| Loss||align=left| Angélique Pitiot || Les Princes de Salm 2 || Moyenmoutier, France || TKO || 5 ||  || 14–6–2
|-  bgcolor="#FFBBBB"
| 13 Sep 2014|| Loss||align=left| Julia Berezikova || Tatneft Cup Rules KO || Kazan, Russian Federation || Decision (Unanimous) || 3 || 3:00 || 14–5–2
|-  bgcolor="#CCFFCC"
| 25 May 2014|| Win||align=left| Lindsay Haycraft || Enfusion Live: Push it 2 the Limit || Amsterdam, Netherlands || Decision (Unanimous) || 5 || 3:00 || 14–4–2
|-
! style=background:white colspan=9 |
|-
|-  bgcolor="#CCFFCC"
| 13 Sep 2014|| Win||align=left| Claire Haigh || Kings of Muay Thaï 5 || Luxembourg City, Luxembourg || Decision (Unanimous) || 3 || 3:00 || 13–4–2
|-  bgcolor="#FFBBBB"
| 8 Feb 2014|| Loss||align=left| Claire Haigh || La Nuit du Kick-Boxing || Liège, Belgium || Decision (Unanimous) || 3 || 3:00 || 12–4–2
|-  bgcolor="#CCFFCC"
| 30 Nov 2013|| Win||align=left| Stephanie Ielö Page || Battle Arena || Merchtem, Belgium || Decision (Unanimous) || 3 || 3:00 || 12–3–2
|-  bgcolor="#CCFFCC"
| 11 May 2013|| Win||align=left| Sarah Debaieb || WFCS  || France || Decision (Unanimous) || 5 || 3:00 || 11–3–2
|-
! style=background:white colspan=9 |
|-
|-  bgcolor="#FFBBBB"
| 4 May 2013|| Loss||align=left| Angélique Pitiot || La Nuit des revanches || Bagnolet, France || Decision (Unanimous) || 5 || 3:00 || 10–3–2
|-
! style=background:white colspan=9 |
|-
|-  bgcolor="#CCFFCC"
| 2 Feb 2013|| Win||align=left| Ilona Wijmans || Enfusion 1 || Zwevegem, Belgium || Decision (Unanimous) || 5 || 3:00 || 10–2–2
|-
! style=background:white colspan=9 |
|-
|-  bgcolor="#CCFFCC"
| 24 Nov 2012|| Win||align=left| Eva Berben || Primetime 3 || Merchtem, Belgium || Decision (Unanimous) || 3 || 3:00 || 9–2–2
|-  bgcolor="#FFBBBB"
| 8 Sep 2012|| Loss||align=left| Martina Jindrová || Amazon of K1 Grand Prix || Herne, Germany || Decision (Unanimous) || 5 || 3:00 || 8–2–2
|-
! style=background:white colspan=9 |
|-
|-  bgcolor="#CCFFCC"
| 13 May 2012|| Win||align=left| Hatice Ozyurt || It’s Showtime || Kortrijk, Belgium || Decision (Unanimous) || 3 || 3:00 || 8–1–2
|-  bgcolor="#FFBBBB"
| 31 Mar 2012|| Loss||align=left| Jana Grishina || Fight Night 10 || Tallinn, Estonia || Decision (Unanimous) || 3 || 3:00 || 7–1–2
|-  bgcolor="#CCFFCC"
| 17 Mar 2012|| Win||align=left| Eva Berben  || ? || Turnhout, Belgium || Decision (Unanimous) || 3 || 3:00 || 7–0–2
|-  bgcolor="#CCFFCC"
| 18 Feb 2012|| Win||align=left| Viola Russo || ? || Brussels, Belgium || TKO || 3 ||  || 6–0–2
|-  bgcolor="#CCFFCC"
| 4 Feb 2012|| Win||align=left| Salaysa van den Bos || ? || Zwevegem, Belgium || Decision (Unanimous) || 3 || 3:00 || 5–0–2
|-  bgcolor="#CCFFCC"
| 26 Nov 2011|| Win||align=left| Haïfa Fay || ? || Merchtem, Belgium || TKO || 3 || || 4–0–2
|-  bgcolor="#CCFFCC"
| 8 Oct 2011|| Win||align=left| Hacer Temel || ? || Dilsen-Stokkem, Belgium || Decision (Unanimous) || 3 || 3:00|| 3–0–2
|-  bgcolor="#c5d2ea"
| 5 June 2011|| Draw||align=left| Sarah Debaieb || ? || Beveren, Belgium || Decision (Unanimous) || 3 || 3:00|| 2–0–2
|-  bgcolor="#CCFFCC"
| 14 May 2011|| Win||align=left| Gina Hofman || ? || Belgium || Decision (Unanimous) || 3 || 3:00|| 2–0–1
|-  bgcolor="#c5d2ea"
| 5 Feb 2011|| Draw||align=left| Viola Russo || ? || Zwevegem, Belgium || Decision (Unanimous) || 3 || 3:00|| 1–0–1
|-  bgcolor="#CCFFCC"
| 27 Nov 2010|| Win||align=left| Griet Eeckhout || ? || Merchtem, Belgium || Decision (Unanimous) || 3 || 3:00|| 1–0
|-
| colspan=9 | Legend:

See also
List of female kickboxers

References 

1993 births
Living people
Belgian kickboxers
Kunlun Fight kickboxers
People from Merchtem
Sportspeople from Flemish Brabant